John (French: Jean; 1283 — 1322) was a medieval French nobleman, Lord (seigneur) of Charolais and Saint-Just, who fought in Flanders. He is also known as John of Clermont (Jean de Clermont).

Life 
Lord John was born in 1283 as a son of Robert, Count of Clermont and his wife, Beatrice of Burgundy, Lady of Bourbon.  In 1309c., John married Joanna of Dargies and Catheux (daughter of Renaud II of Dargies and Catheux and his spouse, Agnes). 

John and his wife had;
Beatrice of Charolais, who succeeded her father
Joanna, wife to John I, Count of Auvergne

Burial 
John was buried in Lyon, but his bones were later transferred to Paris.

References

Sources

1283 births
1322 deaths
History of Burgundy
French Roman Catholics
House of Bourbon (France)